"Mercedes Boy" is a song by American singer Pebbles from her 1987 self-titled debut studio album. The song was written by the singer and produced by Charlie Wilson, with additional production from Pebbles. "Mercedes Boy" was released as the album's second single on March 7, 1988, by the MCA label.

"Mercedes Boy" was a big hit in the United States, peaking at number two on the Billboard Hot 100. It is her biggest hit on that chart, to date.

Chart performance
In the United States, "Mercedes Boy" reached number two on the Billboard Hot 100, behind Cheap Trick's "The Flame", number one on the Hot R&B/Hip-Hop songs chart, and number two for two weeks on the Dance Club songs chart.

In Canada, "Mercedes Boy" peaked at number fourteen on the RPM Top Singles chart. In Europe, the single was a moderate success, peaking at number 42 in the United Kingdom, number 50 in New Zealand and number 39 in the Netherlands.

Covers and samples
In 1998 American rapper Yo-Yo sampled "Mercedes Boy" on the Missy Elliott–produced song "Do You Wanna Ride?"
In 1999 American singer Mercedes covered "Mercedes Boy" with altered lyrics on her only studio album Rear End (1999).

Charts

Weekly charts

Year-end charts

References

1988 singles
Perri "Pebbles" Reid songs
1988 songs
MCA Records singles
Songs about cars